The 2023 Triglav osiguranje Radivoj Korać Cup is scheduled to be the 21st season of the Serbian men's national basketball cup tournament. The tournament will be held in Niš from 15–18 February 2023. Crvena zvezda Meridianbet is a two-time defending champion.

Crvena Zvezda Meridianbet once again successfully defended their title beating Mega MIS 96-79 in the final.

Qualified teams
Source

L The league table position after 15 rounds played

Personnel and sponsorship

Venue
On 23 December 2022, it was announced that the tournament will be held in Niš.

Draw 
The draw was held in the Crowne Plaza hotel in Belgrade on 24 January 2023 and conducted at the Arena Sport live show. It was held by participating coaches Željko Lukajić (Spartak) and Miloš Isakov Kovačević (Vojvodina), the Deputy-Mayor of Niš Dušica Davidović, and the Triglav Serbia marketing director Ivana Vulić Živković.

1 The lowest ABA League position after 13 rounds played

Bracket

Quarterfinals
All times are local UTC+1.

Partizan Mozzart Bet v Spartak Office Shoes

Mega MIS v Vojvodina

Crvena zvezda Meridianbet v Borac Mozzart

FMP SoccerBet v Metalac

Semifinals

FMP SoccerBet v Mega MIS

Partizan Mozzart Bet v Crvena zvezda Meridianbet

Final

See also
2022–23 Basketball League of Serbia
2022–23 KK Crvena zvezda season
2022–23 KK Partizan season
2022–23 Milan Ciga Vasojević Cup

References

External links
 

Radivoj Korać Cup
Radivoj